George Charles Bruno (born August 20, 1942) is an American attorney and diplomat, most recently practicing as an immigration lawyer in Manchester, New Hampshire. His diplomatic service included a posting as the U.S. Ambassador to Belize, from 1994 to 1997.

Education
Bruno earned his Bachelor of Arts in Political Science from Hartwick College (1964), Juris Doctor from George Washington Law School, and a Fellowship at the University of Pennsylvania Law School.

Career
Bruno argued and won a U.S. Supreme Court case, thereby preventing people's Social Security benefits from being taken by creditors, when he was just 29. (Philpott v. Essex County Welfare Bd., 409 U.S. 413 (1973) He managed the largest legal aid program in New Jersey, was the first Director of New Hampshire Legal Assistance, was the Assistant Director of the Executive Office of US Attorneys in the Department of Justice, and was elected twice as the Chairman of the NH Democratic Party.

References

1942 births
Living people
Place of birth missing (living people)
20th-century American diplomats
Ambassadors of the United States to Belize
George Washington University Law School alumni
Hartwick College alumni
Immigration lawyers
New Hampshire Democrats
New Hampshire lawyers
People from Manchester, New Hampshire